Symeon Cosburn is an English jazz singer from London. He is best known for his modernised jazz music and cover of The Stranglers song "Golden Brown.”

Symeon released a thirteen-track album entitled Breakfast with the Blues during 2006, primarily devoted to his mother, who died of a terminal illness. The album was produced by Ian Shaw.

During February 2007 he began work on his second album.

References

External links
Official website

Year of birth missing (living people)
Living people
English jazz singers
English male singer-songwriters
British male jazz musicians